Taras Taymurazovich Tsarikayev (born 17 June 1989) is a Russian former professional football player.

Club career
He made his Russian Premier League debut for FC Alania Vladikavkaz on 31 July 2010 in a game against FC Terek Grozny.

Career statistics

External links
 
 

1989 births
Sportspeople from Vladikavkaz
Living people
Russian footballers
Association football defenders
Association football forwards
Russia youth international footballers
FC Spartak Vladikavkaz players
FC Aktobe players
Russian Premier League players
Kazakhstan Premier League players
FC Armavir players
FC Shinnik Yaroslavl players
FC Orenburg players
FC Lokomotiv Moscow players
Russian expatriate footballers
Expatriate footballers in Georgia (country)
FC Metalurgi Rustavi players
FC Luch Vladivostok players